Markos Theodoridis (Greek: Μάρκος Θεοδωρίδης, 1872 – 1952) was a Greek lawyer and politician. He served as a member of parliament for the Thessaloniki constituency and as a minister.

Biography 
He was born in Serres and he studied law. He worked as a lawyer. He fought in the Macedonian Struggle and cooperated with the Consul-General Koromilas and other officials. He was elected as member of parliament for Thessaloniki in 1920, 1926, 1935 and 1936, with the People's Party. He married την Eleni Roumpen Giarmolinski in 1907, a widow with four children.

He served as minister of Hospitalisation in the Gounaris government from 2 March 1922 to 3 May 1922 and in the Protopapadakis government from 9 May 1922 to 28 August 1922. In the Tsaldaris government he served as Agriculture minister from 19 July 1935 to 10 October 1935, and temporarily as Foreign minister.

He died on 4 July 1952.

References 

Greek people of the Macedonian Struggle
Foreign ministers of Greece
Agriculture ministers of Greece
MPs of Thessaloniki
People from Serres
Greek MPs 1920–1922
Greek MPs 1926–1928
Greek MPs 1935–1936
Greek MPs 1936
Greek people from the Ottoman Empire
Greek Macedonians